Noise is a 2007 Australian drama-thriller film written and directed by Matthew Saville. The film stars Brendan Cowell, Henry Nixon, Luke Elliot, Katie Wall, Maia Thomas and Nicholas Bell.

Plot 
The film is set against the landscape of two potentially related murders: that of an engaged woman in the inner-western Melbourne suburb of Sunshine, and that of seven passengers on a Melbourne train. From there, the film deals primarily with the experiences of Lavinia Smart, a young woman who boarded the train shortly after the murders, and police Constable Graham McGahan, who is afflicted with increasingly severe tinnitus. When he requests light duty on account of his tinnitus, Constable McGahan is assigned the night shift of a police information van in Sunshine, where he encounters the traumatized members of the local community, including Lucky Phil, a mentally handicapped man, and Dean Stouritis, the dead woman's fiancé.

At the same time, the film explores the fear Lavinia experiences after the horrific events she witnessed.  Although she escapes with her life, the police are dissatisfied with her statements and accuse her of holding back information.  Lavinia is further traumatized when she realizes that the killer has stolen a portrait that can be used to identify her.  The police try to reassure her of her safety, but a man she identified in a police lineup easily tracks her down and tries to intimidate her.  After Lavinia angrily confronts him and explains her situation, he apologizes and gives her a ride back to her house.

After McGahan dismisses the concerns of Craig Finlay, a profane racist, Finlay ambushes McGahan and opens fire on the van with a shotgun.  Finlay also kills a passing motorist while hunting McGahan, who escapes through a window.  The crashed car's horn cancels out McGahan's tinnitus, and he hears Finlay approaching him.  McGahan kills Finlay, though he is shot and wounded.  After he rescues a baby from the car, McGahan collapses, and the film leaves his ultimate fate unresolved.

Cast 
 Brendan Cowell as Graham McGahan
 Maia Thomas as Lavinia Smart
 Fiona Macleod as Melanie Ryan
 Nicholas Bell as Noel Birchall
 Katie Wall as Caitlin Robinson, Graham's girlfriend
 Henry Nixon as Craig Finlay
 Simon Laherty as Lucky Phil
 Luke Elliot as Dean Stouritis

Production 
Tinnitus was chosen for its inescapability and to emphasise themes of isolation. Matthew Saville begun writing the script after the Port Arthur Massacre in August 1997.  He states that he was fascinated by the country's resilience following their grief.  The film faced commercial issues: it was designed to be difficult to categorize, unknown actors were chosen for casting, and a distinctly Australian voice made foreign distribution difficult.  Saville, however, wanted to remain honest and uncompromising in his script.

Release 
Noise premiered at the 2007 Sundance Film Festival. It received a limited release in Australia on 3 May 2007 and grossed $869,107 at the box office. It was released on DVD on 10 October 2007.

Reception 
Margaret Pomeranz gave the film four and a half stars out of five and David Stratton four out of five on At the Movies. Paul Brynes of The Sydney Morning Herald rated it 3.5/4 stars and called it "an impressive debut, a serious, fresh, surprising film by a writer-director with plenty on his mind." Jake Wilson of The Age rated it 3.5/5 stars and wrote that Saville "demonstrates considerable reserves of dry wit." Russell Edwards of Variety called the film "a slickly executed experiment full of sound and fury, signifying nothing more than technical prowess."

Awards

References

External links
 
 
 Noise at the National Film and Sound Archive

2007 films
Australian drama films
Films directed by Matthew Saville
Films shot in Melbourne
2007 drama films
2000s English-language films
2007 directorial debut films